The NWA Canadian Television Championship was a secondary singles title in Toronto-based NWA affiliate Maple Leaf Wrestling from 1982 to 1984, when the title was abandoned after the promotion left the NWA to join the World Wrestling Federation (WWF). The old Canadian TV title belt was later used as the physical belt for the heavyweight championship of the now-defunct Apocalypse Wrestling Federation in Toronto.

Title history

References
General

Specific

External links
NWA Canadian TV title history

National Wrestling Alliance championships
Maple Leaf Wrestling championships
Television wrestling championships
Canadian professional wrestling championships